The inaugural 2002 CMT Flameworthy Awards premiered on Wednesday, June 12, 2002 from the Gaylord Entertainment Center (later known as the Bridgestone Arena) in downtown Nashville, Tennessee. Later to be known as the CMT Music Awards. Kathy Najimy hosted the ceremony. The CMT Flameworthy Awards were a fan-voted awards show for country music videos and television performance.

Background 
The network, CMT, decided to rework their dated TNN/CMT Country Weekly Music Awards in to a new Award show, styled similalary to the MTV Video Music Awards. CMT asked fans to vote for what music videos they deem "Flameworthy" for the launch of country music's first ever video music awards. CMT stated "Flameworthy recognizes music videos' unique ability to make a lasting impact -- viewers hear it, see it, feel it, love it -- and it becomes flameworthy".

Winners and nominees 
Winners are shown in bold.(nominees styled with "Flameworthy" before each title)

Performances

Presenters 

 Glen Campbell, introduced Alan Jackson and lit the flame of the awards
 Peggy Hill (voiced by Kathy Najimy), stared off Najimy's monologue
 Gary Allen and Chris Cagle, presented Group/Duo Video of the Year
 Trace Adkins and Mini Me, presented Concept Video of the Year
 Rascal Flatts, presented Video Director of the Year
 Montgomery Gentry and Ali Landry, presented Breakthrough Video of the Year
 Ed DeGeorge and Cyndi Thomson, presented Fashion Plate Video of the Year
 Jamie O'Neal and Carolyn Dawn Johnson, presented Male Video of the Year
 Billy Campbell, presented Video Visionary Award to The Chicks
 Carrot Top, presented Laugh Out Loud Video of the Year
 Kenny Chesney, presented Female Video of the Year
 Cletus T. Judd and Chely Wright, presented Hottest Video of the Year
 Travis Tritt, presented Love Your Country Video of the year, memorialized Waylon Jennings and the September 11 Attacks
 Glen Campbell, presented Video of the Year

References 

2002 music awards
2002 awards in the United States
CMT Music Awards
June 2002 events in the United States
2002 in Tennessee